Gyalaphug or Jieluobu is a village located in a disputed part of the Bhutan-China border. China announced its establishment in October 2015. Media reports place the village 8 km within Bhutanese territory of Beyul, Lhuntse district, Bhutan while China places it in Lhodrak, Tibet Autonomous Region.

Map

See also 
 Pangda

References 

Bhutan–China border